Harry Hyde (born August 1869) was a Negro leagues pitcher and Infielder for several years before the founding of the first Negro National League. He played several years with Frank Leland and his Chicago Union Giants, playing with Dangerfield Talbert, Rube Foster, Chappie Johnson, Walter Ball, William Binga, and Charles "Joe" Green.

In 1909, Hyde worked as a backup pitcher to Clarence Lytle and Jimmie Lyons when the Chicago Union Giants toured the midwest and won 46 out of 56 games.

References

External links

Leland Giants players
Negro league baseball managers
Baseball players from Nashville, Tennessee
1869 births
Year of death missing